Jean-Talon Market (French: Marché Jean-Talon) is a farmer's market in Montreal. Located in the Little Italy district, the market is bordered by Jean-Talon Street to the north, Mozart Ave. to the south, Casgrain Ave. to the west and Henri-Julien Ave. to the east. It contains two city-maintained streets both called Place du Marché du Nord.

It is the largest market in Montreal and one of the largest open-air markets in North America.

History
The market was opened to the public in 1933 while Camillien Houde was the city mayor. Before that, the space the market now occupies was a lacrosse field for the "Shamrock Lacrosse Grounds" club.

The market's single building (the chalet) quickly became the focal point for development of the area around it. From the opening until 1961, the chalet was used as a terminal for buses heading to the neighbouring city of Laval. Between 1961 and 1970 a municipal library and a social services centre replaced the bus station. Since then, the space was occupied by administrative offices.

Major renovations were undertaken in 2004 to handle the crowds that populate the market during the summer months. An underground parking lot was constructed, and an above ground structure was built over the underground parking area, to host 20 specialty boutiques.

Activities
The market is open year-round, even during Montreal's severe winters, although during this time walls are placed around the central section of the market while outdoor areas remain vacant. During the peak summer period, between May and October, its open-air arcades are occupied by about 300 vendors, mostly farmers from the countryside around Montreal.

The open air market is surrounded by other food businesses: meat, fish and cheese stores, bulk food emporia, dealers in spices and imported goods, bakeries, restaurants and a branch of the SAQ, among others.

Stores surrounding the open-air market include:
 La Fromagerie Hamel
 William J. Walter boucherie
 Joe la Croûte boulangerie
 Maison de thé Camellia Sinensis

Since July 15, 2006 vehicles are banned from circulating inside the market's streets during the summer weekends.

See also
Atwater Market

References

External links

Marchés Publics de Montréal, the agency that runs Montreal-area farmer's markets

Commercial buildings in Montreal
Farmers' markets in Canada
Marché Jean-Talon
Montreal cuisine
Rosemont–La Petite-Patrie
Tourist attractions in Montreal